Xylopia talbotii is a species of plant in the Annonaceae family. It is endemic to Nigeria.  It is threatened by habitat loss.

References

talbotii
Endemic flora of Nigeria
Vulnerable flora of Africa
Taxonomy articles created by Polbot